Giovanni Guidetti (born 20 September 1972) is an Italian volleyball coach. He's been coaching Turkish team Vakıfbank Spor Kulübü since 2008. He coached the Turkey women's national team between 2017 and 2022.

Career
Guidetti coached from 1995 until 1998 the team Volley 2000 Spezzano in his hometown. In 1997, the team was promoted to the Italian Women's League Serie A. For this success, he was awarded the title "Coach of the Year." Between 1997 and 2000, he served as the vice coach of the Italy women's national volleyball team. During this period, he took part in the 1998 World Championship in Japan and at the 2000 Summer Olympics in Sydney.

After his function at the United States Professional Volleyball League (USPV) in the 2000-01 season, he returned to Italy as coach of Vicenza Volley. He coached the US women's national B-team and the Bulgaria women's national team.

In the season 2003-04, he was the coach of Pallavolo Modena. Afterwards, he transferred to Chieri Volley, where he was named in 2004 again the "Coach of the Year" and won the Women's CEV Cup in 2005. In April 2006, he became the head coach of the Germany women's national team. Since 2008, Guidetti acts as the coach of the Turkish team Vakıfbank.

Guidetti won the gold medal at the 2013 Club World Championship, coaching Vakıfbank Istanbul. 

Between 2015 and 2016, Guidetti coached the Netherlands women's national volleyball team, leading them to silver in the 2015 European championship, bronze in the 2016 Grand Prix, and fourth in the 2016 Summer Olympics. He left the Dutch squad in late 2016, hoping to live full-time in Istanbul, and took up the coaching job for the Turkish national team.

Vakıfbank Years
After signing Vakıfbank, Guidetti just started to build a team that they don't give up in games and improve their volleyball day by day. In his first season, Vakıfbank was good in attacking with some unique players such as Neslihan Demir, Jelena Nikolic, and  Angelina Grün but poor in defense. They completed the Turkish league on top but lost Galatasaray in play-off's first round. In 2009–10 season, Vakıfbank improved their volleyball level, but Fenerbahçe Acıbadem won the league title with a big investment. In 2010–2011 season, Guidetti started to receive a recompense for his work. Vakıfbank Spor Kulübü won the CEV Women's Champions League with a winning streak of 12–0 and got the only unbeaten championship in Champions League history. They defeated the host and favorite one Fenerbahçe Acıbadem in the semi-final after a classic game of 3–2 and Rabita Baku from Azerbaijan in the final game in straight sets of 3–0. On the other hand, they lost the  domestic league championship to  Fenerbahçe Acıbadem again. 2011–2012 season was a big disappointment for Guidetti. They lost RC Cannes in quarter finals of Champions League in golden set. Vakıfbank was leading the golden set with 14–11, but Cannes won 18–16 against the last champions. They lost Turkish League again to Eczacıbaşı VitrA.

2012–2013 season was a record year for Guidetti and his team. They signed with some stars such as Jovana Brakocevic, Saori Kimura, and Naz Aydemir. Vakıfbank Spor Kulübü won Turkish League, Turkish Cup, and Champions League with a winning streak of 47–0. They won all the matches of the season and was a record for volleyball history. All the players contributed in offense, defense, blocking, and service with the help of Guidetti. He used all fourteen players in the games, managing all of them with a great harmony. He was selected to FIVB Coaching Commission after his stable success and re-signed to Turkish side for two more years.

Personal life
On 20 September 2013 he married Turkish volleyball player Bahar Toksoy, the middle blocker of Guidetti's team Vakıfbank and Turkish national team. The couple's first child was born in September 2016.

References

1972 births
Sportspeople from Modena
Italian volleyball coaches
Volleyball coaches of international teams
Italian expatriate sportspeople in the United States
Italian expatriates in Bulgaria
Italian expatriates in the Netherlands
Italian expatriate sportspeople in Germany
Italian expatriate sportspeople in Turkey
Living people
VakıfBank S.K. volleyball coaches
Turkey women's national volleyball team coaches